Mosbolletjies is a traditional Afrikaner or Cape Dutch sweet-bun or bread traditionally made in the wine producing areas of the Western Cape province of South Africa. The name is Afrikaans in origin and is a combination of mos (Afrikaans for partially fermented grape juice) and bolletjies (Afrikaans for "balls" or "buns").  Mosbolletjies can be dried to make rusks.  The buns are typically served with tea or coffee.

History 
The bun originated from French Huguenots refugees who settled the town of Franschhoek in 1688 and introduced viticulture to the region.  Mosbolletjies were typically made during the wine making season when its key ingredient was readily available.

Composition 
Traditionally grape must left over from the production of wine was used to as a leavening agent and added to dough. Spices such as aniseed are added and the mixed dough is then baked. In modern times grape juice and yeast are typically used instead of grape must.

The dough of the buns are rolled into balls and packed tightly into a baking tray giving it a consistent series of bumps that once baked make individual pieces easy to pull off. It is synonymous to and American dish called Monkey Bread.

See also
List of African dishes
List of sweet breads

References

Sweet breads
Yeast breads
Buns
South African cuisine
South African snack foods
South African confectionery